Approved may refer to:
Approved drug, a preparation that has been validated for a therapeutic use by a ruling authority of a government
Approved, a 2013 album by Chester Thompson Trio
Approved (Ubiquitous Synergy Seeker album)